Ligerz railway station is a railway station in the municipality of Ligerz, in the Swiss canton of Bern. It is an intermediate stop on the standard gauge Jura Foot line of Swiss Federal Railways. The station will be closed as part of the building of the Ligerz Tunnel, scheduled to open in 2026.

It is located next to Ligerz (Talstation), the lower station of the funicular , and Ligerz (Schiff), the landing stage for passenger ships of Lake Biel.

Services
The following services stop at Ligerz:

References

External links 
 
 

Railway stations in the canton of Bern
Swiss Federal Railways stations